The S2 10.3 is an American sailboat that was designed by Graham & Schlageter as a racer-cruiser and first built in 1982. The designation indicates the approximate length overall in meters.

Production
The design was built by S2 Yachts in Holland, Michigan, United States from 1982 to 1987, with 45 boats built.

Design
The S2 10.3 is a recreational keelboat, built predominantly of fiberglass, with wood trim. It has a masthead sloop rig, a raked stem, a reverse transom, an internally mounted spade-type rudder controlled by a tiller and a fixed fin keel or shoal draft keel. It displaces  and carries  of ballast.

The boat is fitted with a Japanese Yanmar 2GM diesel engine for docking and maneuvering.

The design has sleeping accommodation for eight people, with a double "V"-berth in the bow cabin, two straight settee berths in the main cabin and two aft cabins with double berths. The galley is located on the starboard side just forward of the companionway ladder. The galley is "L"-shaped and is equipped with a two-burner stove and a sink. A navigation station is opposite the galley, on the port side. The head is located just aft of the bow cabin on the port side.

For sailing downwind the design may be equipped with a symmetrical spinnaker.

See also
List of sailing boat types

References

Keelboats
1980s sailboat type designs
Sailing yachts
Sailboat type designs by Graham & Schlageter
Sailboat types built by S2 Yachts